Reuben Droughns (born August 21, 1978) is a retired American football running back. After playing college football at the University of Oregon, he was drafted by the Detroit Lions in the third round of the 2000 NFL Draft. 
During his nine years playing professional football, Droughns was also a member of the Miami Dolphins, Denver Broncos, Cleveland Browns, and New York Giants of the National Football League. He earned a Super Bowl ring with the Giants in their Super Bowl XLII victory against the New England Patriots.

Following his playing career, Droughns worked as an assistant coach for the Serbian team Vukovi Beograd, the two-time champions of the Central European Football League from 2010-2013.

Early years
Born in Chicago, Droughns moved from the Midwest to Orange County, California where he attended Anaheim High School (Anaheim, California) and was a student and a letterman in football and wrestling. In football, he rushed for 49 touchdowns and 4,915 yards, which ranked as the second-most yards gained in Orange County high school football history when he ended his prep career. He was voted All-Orange County and All-CIF twice and All-Orange League three times, including Back of the Year honors as a senior. Droughns was also an accomplished wrestler, winning the CIF-Southern Section title in 1996 (Division I - 189 pounds) during his senior year.

College career
Droughns played college football at the University of Oregon in 1998 and 1999 and was a two-year starter. In his first game for Oregon, he ran for 202 yards and two scores in a 48-14 rout of Michigan State. Although he missed one game and most of another due to an ankle injury, he would run for 214 yards and three touchdowns in a 63-28 blowout win over Stanford and then 217 yards and three scores on the road against Washington State. One of his most impressive performances came at UCLA, where he ran for 172 yards and a score despite fracturing his right fibula late in the contest (a 41-38 overtime loss), an injury that would force him to miss the rest of the season. Despite the injury, Droughns was still named second team All-Pac=10 for his junior season. Droughns had 1,234 yards and nine touchdowns on 277 carries (4.5) as a senior, including rushing for over 200 yards in three contests, and was a first-team All-Pac-10 choice as a senior. Droughns was a history major at Oregon.

At Merced Junior College, he was a first team JUCO All-America selection as a sophomore after leading the nation in yards in 1997 with 1,611 while also scoring 13 touchdowns and leading the state of California in all-purpose yardage with 1,984 despite missing three games with a broken hand. Prep Star Magazine deemed him the nation's top JUCO running back after that campaign. Droughns was also an honorable mention All-American as a freshman, when he led the Blue Devils in rushing with 1,456 yards and 14 TDs.

Professional career

Detroit Lions

2000 season

He was drafted by the Detroit Lions out of the University of Oregon, in the third round (81st pick overall) of the 2000 NFL Draft. Droughns spent the 2000 season on injured reserve after separating his right shoulder on his first carry in Detroit's opening preseason game against the New England on August 4, then placed on injured reserve August 22.

2001 season
During the 2001 season, he played in nine games and started three for the Lions, rushing for 72 yards on 30 carries (2.4) and catching four passes for 21 yards (5.3) and a touchdown. He was waived by Detroit after Week 1 and was signed to Miami's practice squad on September 18 before being re-signed by the Lions on October 9.

Denver Broncos

2002-2004 seasons

Droughns played for the Denver Broncos for three seasons from 2002 to 2004. Although originally intended to be a fullback, he ultimately rushed for 1,240 yards in 2004. He also tied a playoff franchise record by returning 6 kickoffs in the wildcard loss to Indianapolis, January 4, 2004. Despite this production, Droughns was not guaranteed the starting job for the 2005 season, so he asked for a trade.

Cleveland Browns

2005-2006 seasons
Droughns was traded to the Cleveland Browns on March 30, 2005, for defensive linemen Ebenezer Ekuban and Michael Myers. In 2005 he became the first Browns player to gain 1,000 yards rushing in a season since Earnest Byner and Kevin Mack both achieved the feat in 1985.

New York Giants

2007-2008 seasons
On March 9, 2007, Droughns was traded to the New York Giants in exchange for wide receiver Tim Carter. Droughns battled Derrick Ward for the back-up job but became the third running back for the Giants, and helped the Giants replace the retired Tiki Barber. However, due to his poor performances throughout the year, he dropped to fourth on the Giants depth chart behind rookie Ahmad Bradshaw, and was replaced by Domenik Hixon as kick returner after similar special-teams performances. He was however, primarily used as a goal-line/third down back for most of the regular season, recording a team-leading 6 touchdowns for the season.  During the 2008 preseason, the emergence of D.J. Ware dropped Droughns to fifth on the Giants depth chart at running back, but he managed to make the final 53-man roster playing primarily on special teams.

Droughns was released by the Giants on February 9, 2009.

References

External links
 New York Giants biography

1978 births
Living people
American football fullbacks
Cleveland Browns players
Denver Broncos players
Detroit Lions players
Merced Blue Devils football players
Miami Dolphins players
New York Giants players
Oregon Ducks football players
Players of American football from Chicago
Players of American football from Anaheim, California
African-American coaches of American football
African-American players of American football
21st-century African-American sportspeople
20th-century African-American sportspeople
American expatriate sportspeople in Serbia
Coaches of American football from California